Antun is a Croatian masculine given name used in Croatia. It is a common given name, cognate to the name Anthony. Other such Croatian names include Ante, Anton and Toni.

Antun is also a surname found in Syria.

Given name 

Antun Augustinčić (1900–1979), Croatian sculptor
Antun Karlo Bakotić (1831–1887), Croatian writer and physicist
Antun Banek (1901–1987), Yugoslav cyclist
Antun Barac (1894–1955), Croatian historian
Antun Bauer (archbishop) (1856–1937), Croatian theologian, philosopher and Archbishop
Antun Bauer (museologist) (1911–2000), Croatian museologist and collector
Antun Petar Bezjak, birthname of Zvonko Bezjak (born 1935), Croatian hammer thrower
Antun Blažić (1916–1943), Croatian resistance fighter
Antun Bogetić (1922–2017), Croatian Prelate
Anton Cerer (1916–2006), Slovenian swimmer
Antun Dalmatin (fl. 16th century), Croatian translator and publisher
Antun Dobronić (1878–1955), Croatian composer 
Antun Dunković (born 1981), Croatian footballer
Antun Fabris (1864–1904), Croatian writer, publisher and politician
Antun Fischer (1911–1985), Serbian wrestler
Antun Herceg (born 1927), Serbian footballer
Antun Ivanković (born 1939), Croatian rower
Antun Kanižlić (1699–1777), Croatian Jesuit and poet
Antun Pasko Kazali (1815–1894), Croatian folk-writer, poet and translator
Antun Knežević (1834–1889), Bosnian Franciscan friar
Antun Kovacic (born 1981), Australian footballer
Antun Kropivšek (1925–2013), Croatian gymnast
Antun Labak (born 1970), Croatian footballer 
Antun Lokošek (born 1920), Croatian footballer
Antun Lović, birthname of Toni Lović (born 1967), Croatian guitarist and record producer
Antun Lučić, birthname of Anthony Francis Lucas (1855–1921), Croatian-born oil explorer
Antun Maqdisi (1914–2005), Syrian politician
Antun Marković (born 1992), Croatian footballer
Antun Gustav Matoš (1873–1914) Croatian writer
Antun Mavrak (1899–1938), Croatian revolutionary
Antun Mažuranić (1805–1888), Croatian writer and linguist
Antun Mihalović (1868–1949), Croatian politician
Antun Mihanović (1796–1861), Croatian poet and lyricist
Antun Miletić (born 1931), Croatian historian
Antun Najžer, Croatian medical doctor and war criminal 
Antun Nalis, also known as Tonči Nalis, (1911–2000), Croatian actor
Antun Nardelli, full name of Ante Nardelli (1937–1995), Croatian water polo player
Antun Nemčić (1813–1849), Croatian writer
Antun Palić (born 1988), Croatian footballer
Antun Pogačnik, also known as Toni Pogačnik, (1913–1978), Croatian footballer
Antun Radić (1868–1919), Croatian politician
Antun Rudinski (1937–2017), Serbian footballer and football manager
Antun Branko Šimić (1898–1925), Croatian poet
Antun Škvorčević (born 1947), Croatian bishop
Antun Šoljan (1932–1993), Croatian writer
Antun Sorkočević (1775–1841), Croatian writer, composer 
Antun Stipančić, also known as Tova Stipančić, (1949–1991), Yugoslav table tennis player
Antun Nikolić Tuca (born 1943), Croatian musician
Anton Tus (born 1931), Croatian general
Antun Vakanović (1808–1894), Croatian politician
Antun Vramec (1538–1587/8), Slovene priest and writer
Antun Vrančić, also known as Antonio Veranzio, (1504–1573), Croatian prelate
Antun Vrdoljak (born 1931), Croatian actor, screenwriter and politician
Antun Vujić (born 1945), Croatian politician

Middle name 
Dragutin Antun Herman (1942–2022) Yugoslavian-born Croatian American. Silicon Valley pioneer, business leader and engineer. 
Ambroz Antun Kapić (1529–1598), Croatian Franciscan priest
Federico Antún Batlle (born 1952), Dominican politician 
Franjo Antun Brtučević, birthname of Francesco Antonio Bertucci (fl. 1595), Croatian friar
Ivan Antun Zrinski (1654–1703), Croatian count
Matija Antun Relković (1732–1798), Croatian military officer and writer

Surname
Farah Antun (1874–1922), Syrian Christians

See also

Antoun
Antuan
Antuna

Notes

Bosnian masculine given names
Croatian masculine given names
Masculine given names